Tuzki is a popular illustrated bunny character, created by Momo Wang (animator), when she was an undergraduate at the Communication University of China (CUC). Featured in a variety of emoticons, her character has become popular with QQ and MSN users.  Nowadays Tuzki has extended his emoticon popularity to different major messaging app platforms including WeChat, KakaoTalk, Facebook and VNG Corporation's Zalo.

According to the official website, Tuzki was born on 6 September 2006.

Tuzki is currently managed by TurnOut Ventures, a joint venture between Turner Broadcasting and Outblaze established in Hong Kong in 2008.

According to a post on Tuzki's official Facebook page, there are over 20 million sends of Tuzki stickers worldwide every day.

History
In 2007 Motorola used the Tuzki images to promote its Motorola Q9h smartphone in Asia, touting its Internet and instant messaging capabilities.

In January 2013 during the KFC#China premium campaign, over 9.5 million units of Tuzki premium figurines were distributed nationwide in China through more than 3,000 KFC restaurants.

In March 2013, the Tuzki edition of the Fujifilm instax mini camera and films were launched in China.

TurnOut Ventures premiered Tuzki: Love Assassin on YouTube on 13 February 2014, as a Valentine's Day stunt for the Tuzki fans, written and directed by Julian Frost, the creator of the viral animation Dumb Ways to Die.  Animation was produced by Studio 4°C.

An image of Tuzki: Love Assassin was displayed on the Thomson Reuters building in New York City Times Square from 14 February to 18 February 2014.

In July 2014, Facebook launched Tuzki stickers on Facebook Messenger, which quickly became one of the most frequently used stickers by Facebook users.  In September, Facebook Japan announced the top 10 most popular sticker sets in Japan and Tuzki was on the list.  By popular demand, Facebook launched the second set of Tuzki stickers in December.

In April 2015, Tuzki was featured on the Financial Times.  The article talks about the success of Tuzki in China and how he has become a surprise hit with millennials from all around the world.  In the same month, CCTV America filed a report on Tuzki, that talks about how Tuzki "takes over amid social media buzz".

On March 22, 2018, Six Flags and Riverside Investment Group announced that they had partnered with Turner to bring Tuzki and other Turner IPs to its upcoming theme parks in China.

On April 20, 2021, it was announced there will be a crossover between Tuzki and the Indian animated series Lamput.

Cartoon Network
August 3, 2021. Lamput had an episode named "Lamput meets Tuzki".
In that episode, there will be a school bus arriving, then every kid will get out from the bus while Tuzki is sleeping.
Another scene where Tuzki needed to go to the restroom, after that, Tuzki didn't know where to go so he/she went to a room
where there's Lamput's room. Tuzki and Lamput are now friends.
You can try to watch the episode!

References

External links
Official Tuzki Website
Creator's Website

Chinese popular culture
Fictional rabbits and hares
Web animation